Sam Tinnesz is an American singer and songwriter.

Biography
Sam Tinnesz is based in Nashville, Tennessee and signed through Warner Music Group’s ADA. Tinnesz's songs have been streamed over 100 million times. His Spotify reach each month is over 2.1 million listeners.

Tinnesz was featured in the song “Don't Give Up On Love” with Kygo which reached a Billboard top position of 35, spending 2 weeks on the charts with a peak date of June 12, 2020.

Tinnesz wrote and recorded the song “Better Together” with Unsecret via Zoom and during quarantine on April 8, 2020.

His music has been featured in Charmed, Batwoman, Love Island, American Ninja Warrior, The Hills: New Beginnings, So You Think You Can Dance, The Society, The Challenge, World of Dance, Siesta Key, Riverdale, Quantico, and others.

Tinnesz is a gamer. His song “Wolves” was used in a commercial for Apex Legends and his song “Fire It Up” (feat. Ruelle) was used in the 2019 Xbox E3 trailer.

Collaborations
Sam Tinnesz has collaborated with Ruelle, Fleurie, Tommee Profitt, Kygo, Banners, Daniella Mason, Manafest and Our Last Night.

Discography
Albums
 Babel (2017)
 White Doves (2020)
 Warplanes (2020)
 There Goes the Neighborhood (2023)

Film and television placements

References 

American songwriters
Living people
American male guitarists
American male bass guitarists
21st-century American bass guitarists
American pop guitarists
21st-century American male musicians
Year of birth missing (living people)